Sudzha is the name of several inhabited localities in Russia.

Urban localities
Sudzha, Kursk Oblast, a town in Sudzhansky District of Kursk Oblast

Rural localities
Sudzha, Republic of Buryatia, a settlement under the administrative jurisdiction of the Town of Kyakhta in Kyakhtinsky District of the  Republic of Buryatia